Jules Iloki (born 14 January 1992) is a French professional footballer who last played as a winger for Chinese Super League club Tianjin Jinmen Tiger.

Club career
Iloki made his Ligue 1 debut at 25 October 2014 against Evian Thonon Gaillard in a 2–0 away win. He replaced Vincent Bessat after 73 minutes.

On 30 July 2020, Iloki transferred to China League One club Sichuan Jiuniu. On 22 October 2020, Iloki was loaned to fellow China League One club Suzhou Dongwu.

International career
Iloki was born in France and is of DR Congolese descent, and was called up to the Democratic Republic of the Congo national football team in 2015.

Career statistics
.

Honours 
Nantes U19

 Coupe Gambardella runner-up: 2008–09

References

External links

1992 births
Living people
Footballers from Paris
Association football midfielders
French footballers
French sportspeople of Democratic Republic of the Congo descent
ESA Linas-Montlhéry players
FC Nantes players
CS Concordia Chiajna players
Sichuan Jiuniu F.C. players
Ligue 1 players
Liga I players
China League One players
French expatriate footballers
French expatriate sportspeople in Romania
Expatriate footballers in Romania
French expatriate sportspeople in China
Expatriate footballers in China
Black French sportspeople